The Barranbinya, also written Baranbinja and other variants, are an Aboriginal Australian people of New South Wales.

Country

Barranbinya territory extended over an estimated  along the northern bank of the Darling River from Bourke to Brewarrina.

Language

Alternative names
 Barren-binya
 Barrumbinya, Burrumbinya, Barrunbarga( typo)
 Baranbinja
 Burranbinga, Burrabinya
 Burranbinya, Burrunbinya
 Parran-binye

Source:

Notes

Citations

Sources

Aboriginal peoples of New South Wales
South Coast (New South Wales)